

The RotorSport UK MT-03 is a two-seat autogyro manufactured to British Civil Airworthiness Requirements CAP643 Section T. New build-aircraft based on the AutoGyro MT-03 design are imported from Germany and completed to British regulations by RotorSport UK Limited in the United Kingdom.

The autogyro has two tandem seats and is powered by a  Rotax 912 ULS although optionally a  Rotax 914 UL Turbo can be fitted.

An unmanned reconnaissance technology demonstrator variant has been proposed as the BAE Ampersand.

A derivative of the MT-03 is the enclosed-cockpit RotorSport UK Calidus.

Specifications (Rotax 912)

See also
AutoGyro MT-03
List of rotorcraft

References

Notes

2000s British civil utility aircraft
AutoGyro GmbH aircraft
Single-engined pusher autogyros